Will Grayson, Will Grayson is a novel by John Green and David Levithan, published in April 2010 by Dutton Juvenile. The book's narrative is divided evenly between two boys named Will Grayson, with Green having written all of the chapters for one and Levithan having written the chapters for the other, presented in an alternating chapter fashion. One boy is referred to with a capitalized letter at the start of his name, while the other is referred to in all lower case letters. The novel debuted on The New York Times children's best-seller list after its release and remained there for three weeks. It was the first LGBT-themed young adult novel to make it to that list.

Collaboration
In designing the plot for the book, the two authors decided to split it evenly in half. John Green wrote all the odd-numbered chapters (capitalized Will Grayson) while David Levithan wrote all the even-numbered chapters (lower case will grayson). This also held true for the main characters' names, with Levithan choosing the given name and Green the surname. The only plot they decided on together was the fact that the two characters would meet at some point in the novel and that their meeting would have a tremendous effect on their lives. After this decision, they separately wrote the first chapter for their half and then shared them with each other. After sharing, they then "knew immediately it was going to work", as stated by Levithan.

Structure
The story is told from two different perspectives, through both Will Grayson 1 and Will Grayson 2. When reading the odd-numbered chapters, the reader sees high school through the eyes of a heterosexual teenager, Will Grayson 1, who mostly believes in shutting up. When reading the even-numbered chapters, the reader sees high school through the eyes of a depressed gay teenager, Will Grayson 2. Though there are two separate characters speaking, the story remains the same from start to finish. As the story progresses, the perspectives do, however, blend together into one clear and cohesive storyline, rather than two separate plot lines, within the same high school story, told by two different characters.

At the beginning of the story, it is clear to distinguish between two completely different voices between the chapters; the reader is able to decipher when Will Grayson 1 is taking center stage when he talks about the girl that he's been crushing on, Jane Turner. Will Grayson 1's chapters are told with proper punctuation and capitalization, whereas Will Grayson 2's chapters are filled with more vulgarity, though Will Grayson 1 is just as vulgar and crude as Will Grayson 2 is. Will Grayson 2's chapters are filled with little character scripts of both casual and digital conversations that he has with his mom, his friend Maura (who is also attracted to him both platonically and romantically), and his crush, at the beginning of the story, Isaac, who goes by the alias of boundbydad via instant messaging.

As the story progresses, the stories of Will Grayson 1 and Will Grayson 2 become entangled, carrying strong themes of young love, teen angst and rebellion, and self-discovery throughout the book until the ending scene.

Dialogue
With the story's strongest focus being the musical about Tiny Cooper, Tiny Dancer, the chapters that are enumerated for Will Grayson 2 all follow a written dialogue that echoes that of a script, with character names preceding a colon before their dialogue is written in the text. The conversations before Will Grayson 2 meets Will Grayson 1 echo that of a chatroom instant message, with usernames and special nicknames for the characters preceding each of the conversation pieces. The text is written this way to help the reading audience relate to the happenings of the story better, by familiarizing the way that each chunk of dialogue is received.

Synopsis

The novel follows two boys who both have the name Will Grayson. The first Will, whose POV always has correct capitalization, is described as trying to live his life without being noticed. This is complicated by the fact that his best friend, Tiny Cooper, described as "the world's largest person who is really, really gay" and "the world's gayest person who is really, really large", is not the type to go around unnoticed. Tiny is also throughout the novel trying to create an autobiographical musical, which further draws attention to himself and everyone around him.

The other Will Grayson, whose POV never has capitalization, goes through his life without anything good to hold on to besides an online relationship with someone who goes by the name Isaac. Intent on meeting up with Isaac, Will Grayson sets up an encounter one night in Chicago but eventually finds out that Isaac was invented by a girl named Maura (who is also his peer in his daily school life). What ensues brings both characters together and changes both of their lives forever in ways they could never have guessed or imagined.

Characters

Main characters
: First protagonist of the story. He lives in the Chicago suburb of Evanston, Illinois, home to Northwestern University, where his parents want him to attend university. His point of view is seen in the odd-numbered chapters, where the entirety of the text shows proper capitalization. He is the first, and only, male straight-identifying member of the Gay Straight Alliance. He is a fan of the band Neutral Milk Hotel. Jane Turner is his love interest; Tiny Cooper is his best friend. His character is written by John Green.
: Second protagonist of the story. He lives in the Chicago suburb of Naperville, Illinois. His point of view is seen in the even-numbered chapters, where the entirety of the text is always lowercased. He has a crush on Isaac, a boy that he met online; the two of them communicate via instant messaging, in secrecy, under the pseudonym grayscale and boundbydad. Meets Tiny Cooper through Will Grayson 1. Will Grayson 2 has been diagnosed with depression, taking antidepressants and claiming, early on, that he is constantly "torn between killing himself and killing everyone around him". He is not close with any major character in his school, though he does interact with his not-so-secret admirer, Maura.

Secondary characters
: Will Grayson 1's best friend in school. He is described as being a large flamboyant homosexual football player who runs through love interests swiftly. He is the president of the Gay-Straight Alliance at school. He is described as "very gay, and very proud". He meets Will Grayson 2 through Will Grayson 1. Though the book may be titled after both Will Graysons, Tiny becomes the primary focus of the story.
: Friend of Tiny and Will Grayson 1. She is also a member of the Gay-Straight Alliance at school, and adores Neutral Milk Hotel. She is Will Grayson 1's love interest.
: A goth girl who is attracted to Will Grayson 2. She is one of the few people at his school with whom he interacts. She is described by Will Grayson 2 as "unrealistically friendly", because she pays "too much attention" to him when he describes himself as uninteresting. Maura poses as the online love interest of Will Grayson 2, Isaac, to gain Will's attention, admiration, and further, affection.

Themes
Friendship
Friendship plays an interesting role in each of the characters' own personal story. For the majority of his story, Will Grayson 1 and Tiny Cooper have a scattered friendship, with visible cracks from the mistakes that Will has made in his past. As for Will Grayson 2 and Maura, their friendship reflects more of a touch-and-go relationship, picking up and leaving off whenever Will decides to consider Maura as his friend. With the blossoming relationship between Jane and Will Grayson 1, soon Will and Tiny begin to drift apart. The role of friendship creates a series of changes, breaks, differences, and conflict throughout each of the protagonists' stories.
Music
Music is referenced to throughout the story with Neutral Milk Hotel, a band that brings together all of the main characters in the book and becomes entangled in each of their stories. While the music groups, both real and fictional, do not become characters themselves in the story, the music that they create becomes relevant to each of their personalities. While both obscure Jane and nonchalant Will Grayson 1 both share a common interest with the alternative band Neutral Milk Hotel, Tiny Cooper, the fabulously flamboyant character of the story, fancies big, bold Broadway-showtunes and music that becomes main-streamed as iconic pop culture.

See also

Other novels by John Green
An Abundance of Katherines
Looking for Alaska
Paper Towns
Let It Snow: Three Holiday Romances
The Fault in Our Stars
Turtles All the Way Down

Other novels by David Levithan
Boy Meets Boy
The Realm of Possibility
Wide Awake
The Lover's Dictionary
Every Day

Bibliography

References

External links 
 
 Interesting Reader Society - School Library Journal
 "David Levithan and John Green's Will Grayson, Will Grayson" - Symphony Space
 Review on Youth Services Corner 

2010 American novels
2010 LGBT-related literary works
American young adult novels
American LGBT novels
Gay male teen fiction
Collaborative novels
Dutton Children's Books books
Novels by John Green (author)
Novels by David Levithan
Books with cover art by Rodrigo Corral
LGBT-related young adult novels
2010s LGBT novels
Novels set in high schools and secondary schools